The 1832 United Kingdom general election, the first after the Reform Act, saw the Whigs win a large majority, with the Tories winning less than 30% of the vote.

|}

References 

1832 elections in the United Kingdom